The 2015 Aberto de Tênis do Rio Grande do Sul was a professional tennis tournament played on clay courts. It was the fourth edition of the tournament which was part of the 2015 ATP Challenger Tour. It took place in Porto Alegre, Brazil between 28 September and 4 October 2015.

Singles main-draw entrants

Seeds

 1 Rankings are as of September 21, 2015.

Other entrants
The following players received wildcards into the singles main draw:
  Marcelo Zormann
  Orlando Luz
  Thiago Monteiro
  Thomas Ramos

The following player received entry into the singles main draw as an alternate:
  Carlos Eduardo Severino

The following players received entry from the qualifying draw:
  Agustín Velotti
  Alexandre Tsuchiya
  Oscar Jose Gutierrez
  Pedro Sakamoto

Champions

Singles

 Guido Pella def.  Diego Schwartzman, 6–3, 7–6(7–5)

Doubles

 Gastão Elias /  Frederico Ferreira Silva def.  Cristian Garín /  Juan Carlos Sáez, 6–2, 6–4

External links
Official Website

Aberto de Tenis do Rio Grande do Sul
Aberto de Tênis do Rio Grande do Sul
2015 in Brazilian tennis